Joseph Akinyele Omoyajowo was the Anglican Bishop of Ijebu in Province One of the Church of Nigeria from 1999 until his retirement in 2004. 

He was born  on 31 December 1934 in Isarun, Ondo. Omoyajowo was Professor of Religious Studies at Obafemi Awolowo University. He was the pioneer  Bishop of Ikale-Ilaje (renamed to Bishop of On the Coast) before being posted to Ijebu.

He attended St. John's College, Owo, from 1953 to 1958 and Immanuel College of Theology, Ibadan, from 1961 to 1963. He was at the  University of Ibadan from 1963 to 1970 and Southern Methodist University, Dallas, Texas, USA, from 1968 until 1969. He was a lecturer at the University of Ibadan from 1970 till 1975, and became Professor of Religious Studies at Obafemi Awolowo University in 1981.

He is a prolific author; his books include Bishop Isaac Oyelaja Sonola Okunsanya: His Life and Time and Cherubim and Seraphim: The History of an African Independent Church.

References 

 

1934 births
Living people
Anglican bishops of On the Coast
Anglican bishops of Ijebu
20th-century Anglican bishops in Nigeria 
21st-century Anglican bishops in Nigeria
Nigerian Anglicans
Academic staff of Obafemi Awolowo University
Academic staff of the University of Ibadan
University of Ibadan alumni
Alumni of Immanuel College of Theology, Ibadan
Southern Methodist University alumni